The 1935–36 season was Arsenal's 17th consecutive season in the top division of English football. They won the FA Cup for the second time in their history, after failing to retain the league for the third time running after finishing 6th, eleven points off champions Sunderland. The Gunners faced Sheffield United in the final at Wembley, and narrowly won 1-0 thanks to a Ted Drake goal. They had beaten Bristol Rovers, Liverpool, Newcastle (after a replay), Barnsley and Grimsby Town en route to Wembley. 
Early in the season, Arsenal had lost the Charity Shield 1–0 to Sheffield Wednesday, but two months later claimed their biggest win of the season, 7–1 at Aston Villa, with Ted Drake setting the all-time record for the most goals in one English top division match, after scoring all seven goals. He would finish as the club's top scorer that season with 24 league goals and 3 in the FA Cup.

Results
Arsenal's score comes first

Legend

Football League First Division

Final League table

FA Cup

Arsenal entered the FA Cup in the third round, in which they were drawn to face Bristol Rovers.

See also

 1935–36 in English football
 List of Arsenal F.C. seasons

References

English football clubs 1935–36 season
1935-36